Zosteropoda clementei is a moth of the family Noctuidae. It is found in California on the Channel Islands, including San Clemente, Santa Cruz, and Santa Rosa.

References 

Hadeninae
Moths described in 1942